Sarita Mor is an Indian freestyle wrestler.

Career 
She won the silver medal at the 2017 Asian Wrestling Championships in the 58 kg weight class and the gold medal at the 2020 Asian Wrestling Championships in the 59 kg weight class.

In 2021, she won the silver medal in the 57 kg event at the Matteo Pellicone Ranking Series 2021 held in Rome, Italy. She also won the bronze medal at the 2021 World Wrestling Championships held in Oslo, Norway. She competed in the 57kg event at the 2022 World Wrestling Championships held in Belgrade, Serbia.

Personal life 
Sarita Mor is from Sonipat district in Haryana. She started playing kabaddi and wrestling in her school when she was 12. She works with the Indian Railways.

References

External links
 

Living people
1995 births
Female sport wrestlers from Haryana
People from Sonipat district
Asian Wrestling Championships medalists
20th-century Indian women
21st-century Indian women
Recipients of the Arjuna Award